The 1974 California Attorney General election was held on November 5, 1974. Incumbent Republican Evelle J. Younger defeated Democratic nominee William Albert Norris with 55.00% of the vote.

Primary elections
Primary elections were held on June 4, 1974.

Democratic primary

Candidates
William Albert Norris, attorney
Vincent Bugliosi, former Los Angeles County Deputy District Attorney

Results

General election

Candidates
Evelle J. Younger, Republican
William Albert Norris, Democratic

Results

References

1974
Attorney General
California